Archibald Lindsay was a Scottish professional footballer who played as a left back in the Football League for Fulham. He also played in the Scottish League for St Johnstone, Dundee and Lochgelly United.

Personal life 
Lindsay served as a private in the Black Watch during the First World War.

Honours 
St Johnstone
Consolation Cup: 1913–14

Career statistics

References

Scottish footballers
English Football League players
British Army personnel of World War I
Southern Football League players
1882 births
Year of death missing
People from Rosneath
Association football fullbacks
Black Watch soldiers
Scottish Football League players
Rutherglen Glencairn F.C. players
Renton F.C. players
Reading F.C. players
Fulham F.C. players
Dundee F.C. players
Third Lanark A.C. players
St Johnstone F.C. players
Lochgelly United F.C. players
Sportspeople from Argyll and Bute